Vesse may refer to:

 Vesse, rail station in Sõjamäe, Tallinn, Estonia
 Vesse, leader of the Oeselians in St. George's Night Uprising